Every Day Except Christmas is a 37-minute documentary film filmed in 1957 at the Covent Garden fruit, vegetable and flower market, which was at that point still in central London. It was directed by Lindsay Anderson and  produced by Karel Reisz and Leon Clore under the sponsorship of Ford of Britain, the first of the company's "Look at Britain" series. It was filmed by Walter Lassally.

Every Day and other short, mostly documentary films made within two or three years, reflected the concept of Free Cinema, films which were "free" in the sense that they were made outside the traditional structure of filmmaking.

The film received a BAFTA nomination for Best Documentary; and won the Grand Prix at the Venice Festival of Shorts and Documentaries.

Synopsis
Opening with a title card dedicating the film to about seven or eight of the drivers/loaders and market workers whom we'll meet as the film progresses, Anderson establishes the rituals of the daily routine; the loading of the lorries, the post-midnight drive through the deserted country and city streets as, voice over, the BBC Light Programme's announcer says goodnight, signs off, and the national anthem "God Save the Queen" plays.
"All these roads leads to Covent Garden" says the narrator, dramatist Alun Owen, and then there follows a montage of the market workers slowly beginning their night's work, work which they do 364 days a year.  As the "streets are stirring", the vegetables and flowers begin to arrive and stalls are gradually set up; the overall pace of the editing picks up as the activity increases and the rhythm of night establishes itself.

Up to this point, the rhythm of the film parallels that of the activities it portrays; the steady pace of the loading and arrival at Covent Garden gives way to a faster pace of editing as Anderson carefully establishes mood and feeling by focusing on the activities of several of the individual workers who are introduced to us by name. There is some casual bantering, some jokes, some time for a cup of tea, but it's mostly steady work. A montage of shots follows and it establishes the routine: flower and vegetable boxes are being opened and set up, their contents exposed for the buyers, lorries are unloaded, deliveries are being made to the stallholders until, finally all is ready.

So Every Day proceeds by respecting the dignity of the market workers and their roles in the rhythm of the market's operations. Then the pace slows again: it's time for a breather before the buyers arrive. This time Anderson allows his camera and the pace of his editing to focus on many of the individuals relaxing; these include not only the market workers, but the “night time habitués” of the market cafes where they can get a cup of tea, have a chat, snooze a bit, and prepare themselves for the next phase.

By 4 a.m. the market is empty, the streets are empty; the camera pans across silent rows of flower and vegetable stalls. We wait. “Daylight brings traffic back to the market” says the narrator, and the mood quickly changes. It's suddenly busier, noisier, and the film's rhythms reflect this. The familiar sound of the BBC Home Service announcer's “good morning” at 6.30am is heard against the arrival of many of the corporate buyers, those from the large store chains. By 7am business is brisk, and this is reflected in the many voice-overs we hear with snippets of conversation, orders being taken, porters given instructions, all the natural sounds of market activity placed over a montage of constant movement. Then, as movement is "steadily outwards" there is a sequence of porters (originally, we are told, all were women; only one remains, Alice, an elderly woman) with boxes of all sorts, many mounted on their heads, moving the produce and flowers out to waiting lorries and larger barrows.

As the market activity slows by about 8am, once again the film's pacing reflects a quieter time in the workers’ day. Cafes are busy again and older female flower sellers, around since Queen Victoria was on the throne, we are told, look for bargains as we hear their chatter about the old days when every man wore a flower. "By 11am there's nothing left" and loading of big lorries going out into the country is well under way. In a montage of loaded lorries leaving the market (not surprisingly, perhaps, a few of which are made by Ford) the activities have come full circle: the market's day ends where it began, and film comes to an end with a review of the faces of the market workers to whom the film is dedicated.

Critical reaction
As noted by critic Christophe Dupin: "The film evokes what Anderson has called the 'poetry of everyday life' and has the best lyrical qualities of the wartime films of Anderson's idol Humphrey Jennings."

References

External links

BFI's "screenonline" on Every Day Except Christmas.

1957 films
British documentary films
Cultural history of the United Kingdom
Films directed by Lindsay Anderson
1957 documentary films
Documentary films about London
Covent Garden
Documentary films about business
Retail markets
1950s English-language films
1950s British films